Miika Roine (born December 8, 1991) is a Finnish professional ice hockey player. He is currently playing for Jukurit of the SM-liiga.

Roine made his SM-liiga debut playing with JYP Jyväskylä during the 2011–12 SM-liiga season.

References

External links

1991 births
Living people
Finnish ice hockey forwards
Sportspeople from Jyväskylä
21st-century Finnish people